Đăk Glei is a township and capital of Đăk Glei District, Kon Tum Province, Vietnam.

References

Populated places in Kon Tum province
District capitals in Vietnam
Townships in Vietnam